Bratwurst-Röslein is a traditional restaurant in Nuremberg, Germany founded in 1431. The restaurant, which claims to be the largest sausage restaurant in the world, is located in the old town at the Nuremberg Christkindlesmarkt.

See also 
List of oldest companies

References

External links 
Homepage in German

Restaurants in Germany
Companies established in the 15th century
15th-century establishments in the Holy Roman Empire